The Chevrolet Groove is one of three small car concepts introduced on 4 April 2007 at the New York International Auto Show. 

The Groove showcases a new style of small car from General Motors. The mini car was completely designed by GM Daewoo in South Korea. The Groove is powered by a 1.0 L diesel engine that is similar to the one powering the current Chevy Spark, a minicar sold in Asia.

The Chevrolet Beat and the Chevrolet Trax were also showcased to provide a vision for future designs in the GM subcompact segment. These three concepts could be voted on after their introduction on a special website. In the end, both the Groove and Trax lost to the Beat, which is slated for production.

Both Beat and Trax were eventually green-lit for production. While the Groove was not, design language from it has found its way into the Chevrolet Sonic and Chevrolet Orlando designs.

Nameplate usage 

In 2020, SAIC-GM-Wuling started exporting the Baojun 510 to Latin America and the Middle East with the Chevrolet Groove nameplate.

References

Groove
Groove
GM Korea concept cars
Cars introduced in 2020
Mini sport utility vehicles